The Mk 61 105 mm Self-Propelled Howitzer was a French self-propelled artillery piece designed and built during the late 1950s for the French Army.

History 
During World War II a number of nations produced self-propelled artillery.  These ranged from heavily armored assault guns with 360° protection to lightly-armored open topped tank-destroyers and self-propelled guns.  Often the chassis for these conversions came from tanks or artillery tractors and two such vehicles were the US built M7 Priest and M12 gun motor carriage supplied to Free French forces during World War II.  During the 1950s France began a rearmament program to replace both of these guns to provide mobile artillery support for their mechanized divisions.  Like in World War II the chassis for these new weapons was a light tank the French AMX-13.

Design 

The new vehicle had the same five-wheeled torsion bar suspension with front drive sprocket, rear idler and three return rollers as the AMX-13.  The road wheels had solid rubber tires and the metallic tracks could be fitted with rubber traction blocks to lessen damage to roads.  An all-welded box-shaped steel superstructure was mounted to the rear of the vehicle to provide 360° of protection from small arms rifle fire and shell splinters.  Although protected from all directions the vehicle lacks NBC (nuclear, biological, chemical) capability and is not amphibious.  The engine and transmission are at the front of the vehicle and the driver is on the left.  The gun compartment has a commanders cupola with a periscope and 360° vision blocks.  The cupola also has a ring mount for an external 7.5 or 7.62 mm light machine gun (LMG).  The gun compartment also has access hatches at the top and rear.   

The primary armament for the vehicle is an Obusier de 105 modèle 1950 howitzer with a wide range of elevation -4° to +66° but with limited traverse 20° right and left. Traverse and elevation are both manual. French, Israeli, and Moroccan vehicles have a gun barrel which is 23 calibers in length while Dutch vehicles have a barrel 30 calibers in length. Both have a hydro-pneumatic recoil system below the barrel and both are fitted with a double-baffle muzzle brake. The gun fires semi-fixed  ammunition and 55 rounds of ammunition can be carried in the gun compartment. Generally, 6 of the 55 rounds were high-explosive anti-tank warhead (HEAT) with the remaining rounds being HE (high explosive).

The Mk 61 has more than likely been retired by its users and replaced by either  or  self-propelled artillery capable of 360° fire.

Mk 62 
A variant with a longer barrel and a turret capable of 360° of traverse was offered to Switzerland and although it was tested it was not adopted by them.

Users

Photo gallery

References 

105 mm artillery
Cold War artillery of France
Self-propelled artillery of the Cold War
Military vehicles introduced in the 1950s